The discography of the British space rock group Hawkwind spans from their formation in 1969 through to the present day, with consistent output of live and studio albums, EPs and singles. The group have used aliases to release some albums in an attempt to either redefine themselves, as with the 1978 album 25 Years On released under the name Hawklords, or simply to distinguish the piece of work from their usual output, as with White Zone released under the name Psychedelic Warriors.

From 1970 through to 1975, the group were contracted to Liberty/UA producing their most commercially successful and critically acclaimed work, five studio albums, the UK top 9 live album Space Ritual and five singles, including the UK top 3 single "Silver Machine". This catalogue is now owned by EMI and is in print.

The mid-late 1970s saw them produce four studio albums under contract to Charisma. In the early 1980s, they produced a studio album and live album under contract to Bronze in 1980, then three studio albums for Rockfield Studios owner Kingsley Ward's Active/RCA. Since then, the band have recorded for numerous independent labels, including Flicknife, their former manager Douglas Smith's label GWR, Essential (through Castle Communications), and from 1994-97 their own label EBS administered by Smith.

The catalogue from this 1976-97 period has passed through various record companies and seen numerous releases, in North America through Griffin, and some counterfeit copies on the German label Rock Fever. It was secured by Cherry Red in the UK for their Atomhenge imprint in 2008 and has been re-issued with the inclusion of previously unreleased bonus tracks.

Between 1999 and 2007, the band released both new and archive material through Voiceprint, this catalogue now being out of print.

At the beginning of 1980, Dave Brock started collating material from his archives and issuing cassette tape albums under the imprint Weird Records. He would subsequently license these recordings to various independent record companies, such as Flicknife, former bass player Dave Anderson's American Phonograph, the then band manager Jim White's Samurai and later Voiceprint. This material has been subject to many retitling, repackaging and re-issuing through different labels, leading to multitudes of cheap titles of which the band have no control.

Albums
This section contains official (i.e. contractual and contemporaneous) albums that Hawkwind have recorded live or in the studio for release. It has long been a practice of theirs to incorporate live recordings (albeit with studio overdubs) of previously unreleased tracks on studio albums (for example Hall of the Mountain Grill), and studio recordings of previously unreleased tracks on live albums (for example Palace Springs). Compilation albums listed are those that have been compiled by record labels that had Hawkwind under contract to produce a series of albums.

Studio

Live

Compilation

Singles and EPs
The singles and EPs listed here, in the main, are all of those that went on general release in the UK. There are a couple of overseas releases included as they are significant in that their A-side and/or B-side were unavailable in the UK.

EPs
1984 – The Earth Ritual Preview EP: "Night of the Hawk" / "Green Finned Demon"; "Dream Dancers"; "Dragons & Fables" (Flicknife, FLEP104, 12")
1993 – Decide Your Future EP: "Right to Decide"; "The Camera That Could Lie"; "Right to Decide (Radio Edit Mix)"; "Assassin (Magick Carpet Mix)" (4-Real, 4R2, 12" & CD)
1994 – Quark, Strangeness and Charm EP: "Uncle Sam's on Mars (Red Planet Radio Mix)"; "Quark, Strangeness and Charm"; "Black Sun"; "Uncle Sam's on Mars (Martian Conquest Mix)" (EBS, EBCD110, 12" & CD)
1995 – Area S4 EP: "Alien (I Am)"; "Sputnik Stan" (12" only); "Death Trap"; "Wastelands of Sleep"; "Are You Losing Your Mind?" (EBS, EBCD107, 12" & CD)

Singles
1970 – "Hurry on Sundown" / "Mirror of Illusion" (Liberty, LBF15382, 7")
1972 – "Silver Machine" / "Seven By Seven" (United Artists, UP35381, 7", UK#3). Re-released 1976 (7"), 1978 (7" & 12", UK#34) and 1982 (7", 7" pic disc & 12", UK#67)
1973 – "Lord of Light" / "Born to Go (Live)" (United Artists, UA35492, 7", German)
1973 – "Urban Guerrilla" / "Brainbox Pollution" (United Artists, UP35566, 7", UK#39) Withdrawn after 3 weeks of release.
1974 – "You'd Better Believe It" / "Paradox" (United Artists, UP35689, 7", France)
1974 – "The Psychedelic Warlords" / "It's So Easy" (United Artists, UP35715, 7")
1975 – "Kings of Speed" / "Motorhead" (United Artists, UP35808, 7")
1976 – "Kerb Crawler" / "Honky Dorky" (Charisma, CB289, 7")
1977 – "Back on the Streets" / "The Dream of Isis" (Charisma, CB299, 7")
1977 – "Quark, Strangeness and Charm" / "The Forge of Vulcan" (Charisma, CB305, 7")
1978 – "Psi Power" / "Death Trap" (Charisma, CB323, 7")
1979 – "25 Years" / "PXR5" (12" only) / "(Only) The Dead Dreams of the Cold War Kid" (Charisma, CB332, 7" & 12")
1980 – "Shot Down in the Night (Live)" / "Urban Guerrilla (Live)" (Bronze, BRO98, 7", UK#59)
1980 – "Who's Gonna Win the War?" / "Nuclear Toy" (Bronze, BRO109, 7")
1981 – "Angels of Death" / "Trans Dimensional Man" (RCA/Active, RCA137, 7")
1982 – "Silver Machine" / "The Psychedelic Warlords"; "Silver Machine (Full Version)" (RCA/Active, RCA267, 7" & 7" pic disc)
1984 – "Night of the Hawk" / "Green Finned Demon" (Flicknife, FLS104, 7")
1985 – "Needle Gun" / "Song of the Swords" (12" only); "Arioch" (Flicknife, FLS032, 7" & 12")
1986 – "Zarozinia" / "Assault and Battery"; "Sleep of 1000 Tears" (12" only) (Flicknife, FLS033, 7" & 12")
1997 – "Love in Space"; "Lord of Light"; "Sonic Attack" (EBS, EBCD106, CD)
2004 – CD1: "Spirit of the Age (Radio Edit)"; "Angela Android (live)"; "Assassins of Allah (live)" / CD2: "Spirit of the Age (live)"; "Paradox (new version)" (Voiceprint, HAWKVP55CD1/2, CD)
2014 – "Sonic Attack" (new version featuring Brian Blessed)

Archive releases
This section lists those Hawkwind albums, EPs and singles that have been compiled and released from previously unissued archive tapes, be it live, studio out-takes or demo material. All of the releases listed here are the original ones; retitles, re-releases and derivatives have purposefully been omitted. Only one release, Bring Me the Head of Yuri Gagarin, was not approved for release by Dave Brock.

Albums

EPs
1981 – Hawkwind Zoo EP: "Hurry on Sundown" / "Sweet Mistress of Pain" [a.k.a "Kiss of the Velvet Whip"]; "Kings of Speed" (Flicknife, FLEP100, 12") – demos 1969, out-take 1975
1981 – Sonic Assassins EP: "Over the Top" / "Freefall"; "Death Trap" (Flicknife, FLEP101, 12") – live 1977
1990 – The Early Years Live EP: "Silver Machine"; "Spirit of the Age" / "Urban Guerilla"; "Born to Go" (Receiver, REPLAY 3014, 12")

Singles
1981 – "Motorhead" / "Valium 10" (Flicknife, FLS205, 7"&12") – out-take 1975, demo 1979
1982 – "Who's Gonna Win the War?" / "Time of the Hawklords" (Flicknife, FLS209, 7") – demo 1979
1983 – "Motorway City" / "Master of the Universe" (Flicknife, FLS025, 7") – live 1980
1986 – "Silver Machine" / "Magnu"; "Angels of Life" (Samurai, HW001, 7" 12" & pic disc)

Various artists compilations
This section contains Various Artists compilations that contain Hawkwind material that was unavailable elsewhere.

Albums

EPs
1993 – Gimme Shelter (Rock) EP: (EMI, 7243 8 805762, 12" & CD, UK#23) Versions of The Rolling Stones' "Gimme Shelter" by Thunder, Little Angels and Hawkwind featuring Samantha Fox. 1 of 4 various artists EPs in benefit of the charity Shelter.

Private pressings
There have been several CDs and DVDs that have been privately pressed by the band and made available for either members of the band's fan club, or for the audience at gigs.
1986 – Hawkfan 12 (vinyl LP, HWFB2) – includes "Countdown", "Ejection", "Ghost Dance"
1999 – Hawkwind 1997 (CD, HAWKVP999)
2002 – Second Annual Christmas Party (CD EP) – Bedouin: "Vision Quest"; Dave Brock: "Sonic Space Attack"; Tim Blake: "Untitled"; Huw Lloyd-Langton: "For Kirsty"; Hawkwind: "Technoland"
2004 – Spaced Out in London (CD, HAWKSR001CD)
2004 – Seasons Greetings from Deep Space (CD EP, HAWKSR002CD) – "Christmas Treat"; "Angela Android" [live]; "The Secret Knowledege of Water"; "Ritual Breathing"
2005 – Take Me to Your Leader: This Is Your Captain Speaking (promo CD, HAWKPROMO35CD) – Dave Brock interview; preview of tracks from Take Me to Your Leader
2008 – Space Melt (DVD)
2009 – 40th Anniversary (CD) – "Who's Gonna Win the War"; "Ode to a Crystal Set"; "Spirit of the Age"; "Starshine"; "Time and Confusion"; "Paradox"; "Something’s Going On"; "Lighthouse"; "Space Love"; "Diana Park"; "The Right to Decide"

References

External links
Hawkeye on Hawkwind – Adrian Parr's fansite. Details all legitimate releases with recording sources and personnel.
Hawkwind Files – Andrew Dawson's fansite. It comprehensively lists all releases, re-releases and bootlegs with worldwide release history.
Hawkwind BLANGA Guide – Rates all core Hawkwind albums by "blanga" score; online since 1995. 
 .

Discography
Discographies of British artists
Hawkwind